Sverre Malvin Stensheim (31 October 1933 – 22 January 2022) was a Norwegian cross-country skier.

Career
He competed in the 30 km and 50 km events at the 1960 and  1964 Winter Olympics with the best result of fifth place in the 50 km in 1964. He won the 50 km race at the Holmenkollen ski festival in 1959–1961, and in 1960 was awarded the Holmenkollen medal (shared with Helmut Recknagel, Sixten Jernberg, and Tormod Knutsen).

Stensheim died on 22 January 2022 at the age of 88.

Cross-country skiing results
All results are sourced from the International Ski Federation (FIS).

Olympic Games

World Championships

References

External links

1933 births
2022 deaths
People from Oppdal
Cross-country skiers at the 1960 Winter Olympics
Cross-country skiers at the 1964 Winter Olympics
Holmenkollen medalists
Holmenkollen Ski Festival winners
Norwegian male cross-country skiers
Olympic cross-country skiers of Norway
Sportspeople from Trøndelag